Keizer is a Dutch surname, meaning "emperor". It is cognate to German Kaiser. Notable people with the surname include:

Bert Keizer (born 1947), Dutch writer and physician
Cees Keizer (born 1986), Dutch football midfielder
Garret Keizer (born 1953), American author
Gerrit Keizer (1910–1980), Dutch sportsman
Henry Keizer (born 1960), Dutch businessman and corporate director
Ilja Keizer (born 1944), Dutch middle-distance runner 
Jan Keizer (referee) (born 1940), Dutch sports referee
Jan Keizer (singer) (born 1949), Dutch singer
Jolanda Keizer (born 1985), Dutch heptathlete
Joris Keizer (born 1979), Dutch swimmer
Marcel Keizer (born 1969), Dutch football manager
Martijn Keizer (born 1988), Dutch racing cyclist
Nick Keizer (born 1995), American football player
Piet Keizer (1943–2017), Dutch football left winger
Sanne Keizer (born 1985), Dutch volleyball player
Simon Keizer (born 1984), Dutch singer
Teddy Keizer (born c.1971), American speed hiker

See also
Keizer (disambiguation)
Keijzer
Keyser

References

Dutch-language surnames